SPJ is the US Society of Professional Journalists

SPJ may also refer to:

Transportation
 Air Service (airline) (former ICAO code SPJ); See List of airline codes (A)
 Samastipur Junction railway station (station code SPJ), India
 Sparti Air Base (IATA code SPJ), Greece

Other uses
 Simon Peyton Jones, British computer scientist
 Self-protective jamming, or SPJ, in radar jamming and deception
 Special Program in Journalism, or SPJ, in Philippine secondary schools; See Technology and Livelihood Education
 Sunrise Party of Japan, or SPJ, a former political party